Trafalgar Wharf is a shipyard in Portsmouth accommodating marine engineering businesses ranging from sailmakers and boat brokers to boat builders. It was formerly the VT Halmatic shipyard, owned by VT Group and latterly by BVT Surface Fleet.

History

In September 2008, Trafalgar Wharf Ltd took over the former BVT Surface Fleet site and renamed it Trafalgar Wharf. The site is the former VT Halmatic shipyard where many smaller Royal Navy warships, such as  Fast Patrol Boats and Corvettes were built. BVT Surface Fleet had been formed by the merger of the BAE Systems Surface Fleet Solutions subsidiary with VT Shipbuilding, itself originating as Vosper Thorneycroft. With the sale of the Portchester site, they vacated the yard, bringing an end to the company's use of the area, consolidating operations at its Shipyard facilities in HMNB Portsmouth.

Site
The  Trafalgar Wharf site is located in the upper reaches of Portsmouth Harbour, opposite Port Solent. The company intends to remain true to its industrial roots, combining light marine trade with heavier industries. The site offers a wide range of space for marine businesses in buildings ranging from the massive  main shed, probably the largest building of its kind on the south coast, to smaller individual business units including office space, housing many companies, overlooking Port Solent Marina.

Trafalgar Wharf has opened its doors in a bid to attract new business with a revamp under way. There are lifting facilities, slipways and holding pontoons. The yard has storage for boats, caravans, motorhomes or other vehicles. There are serviced offices, warehouses, workshops and industrial units for rent.

References

External links
Trafalgar Wharf Website 
Trafalgar Wharf on Facebook

Ports and harbours of Hampshire
Wharves in the United Kingdom